Carl's Blues is an album by American jazz bassist Curtis Counce recorded in 1957 and 1958 and released on the Contemporary label.

Reception
The Allmusic review by Scott Yanow calls it "Excellent music that still sounds fresh four decades later".

Track listing
 "Pink Lady" (Jack Sheldon) - 4:36
 "I Can't Get Started" (Ira Gershwin, Vernon Duke) - 7:59
 "Nica's Dream" (Horace Silver) - 7:58
 "Love Walked In" (George Gershwin, Ira Gershwin) - 4:58
 "Larue" (Clifford Brown) - 4:59
 "The Butler Did It" (Frank Butler) - 4:38
 "Carl's Blues" (Carl Perkins) - 5:54	  
Recorded at Contemporary Studios in Los Angeles, CA on April 22, 1957 (tracks 1 & 4), August 29, 1957 (track 3) and January 6, 1958 (tracks 2 & 5-7)

Personnel
Curtis Counce - bass
Jack Sheldon (tracks 1-4 & 6), Gerald Wilson (tracks 5 & 7) - trumpet
Harold Land - tenor saxophone
Carl Perkins - piano
Frank Butler - drums

References

Contemporary Records albums
Curtis Counce albums
1960 albums